Get Better Records is an American independent record label based in Philadelphia, Pennsylvania.

History and background 
The label was founded by Alex Lichtenauer and Nick King in 2009 in Keene, New Hampshire. King left the label in 2010; Get Better is now co-run by Lichtenauer with Ally Einbinder and Jenna Pup.

Its stated aim is to "reverse the constant underrepresentation of the queer arts community, with a specific focus on punk, hardcore, and alternative rock music". An article in Philadelphia similarly described it as "queer forward".

Releases and events 
In 2017, the label released a compilation album titled A Benefit Comp to Help Pay Medical Bills for Those Activists Fighting Against Fascism and Racism, the proceeds were donated to victims of the Charlottesville car attack and Hurricane Harvey. In June 2020, the label donated its Bandcamp profits to a bail fund based in Philadelphia and Black and Pink.

In 2018, the label released an album for The HIRS Collective featuring guest vocals by Shirley Manson of Garbage, Laura Jane Grace of Against Me!, Martin of Limp Wrist, Sadie of G.L.O.S.S. and others.

The label has released compilations featuring Bren Lukens of Modern Baseball, The Menzingers, Less Than Jake, Spraynard, Laura Stevenson and the Cans, Anti-Flag, Joe Jack Talcum of The Dead Milkmen, and more.

The label hosts "Get Better Fest" which has included Code Orange, Full of Hell, The World Is a Beautiful Place & I Am No Longer Afraid to Die, Mannequin Pussy and more.

Artists

Alice Bag Band
Anti-Flag
Bacchae
Bad Sleep
Cayetana
Choked Up
Coherence
Control Top
Dark Thoughts
Dump Him
Dyke Drama
Empath
Empty Country
The Groans
Godstomper
Hermit High Priestess 
The HIRS Collective
La Dispute
Lande Hekt 
Lilith
LOONE
NONA
Peeple Watchin'
Pictoria Vark
Planet Jackpot
Potty Mouth
Pretty Matty
Ramshackle Glory 
Romantic States
Sheer Mag
Suzie True
TANKINI
Teenage Halloween
Thin Lips
Thou
Yarrow
Worriers

References

External links 

2009 establishments in Pennsylvania
American record labels
Companies based in Philadelphia
Rock record labels